The Radziwiłł Letopis, also known as the Königsberg Chronicle, is a collection of Old East Slavic illuminated manuscripts from the 15th-century; it is believed to be a copy of a 13th-century original. Its name is derived from the Radziwiłł family of the Grand Duchy of Lithuania (later, the Polish–Lithuanian Commonwealth), who kept it in their Nesvizh Castle in the 17th and 18th centuries.

The work is a letopis which tells the history of Kievan Rus' and its neighbors from the fifth to the early 13th centuries in pictorial form, representing events described in the manuscript with more than 600 colour illustrations. Among East Slavic chronicles, the Radziwiłł is distinguished for the richness and quantity of its illustrations, which may derive from the 13th-century original. The chronicle includes the Tale of Bygone Years and extends it with yearly entries until 1206.

Gallery

See also
Academic Chronicle
Illustrated Chronicle of Ivan the Terrible

References

Bibliography

External links 
 
 http://www.unesco.org/webworld/mdm/visite/radzivill/en/present1.html

15th-century illuminated manuscripts
East Slavic chronicles
Illuminated histories
Radziwiłł family
Lithuanian chronicles